Go-Ahead Verkehrsgesellschaft Deutschland GmbH is a railway operator in Germany. A subsidiary of the Go-Ahead Group, it commenced trading on 9 June 2019.

History
In November 2015, Go-Ahead Germany was awarded a contract to operate services by the Baden-Württemberg public transport authority Nahverkehrsgesellschaft Baden-Württemberg from June 2019. In June 2017, Go-Ahead was awarded a further contract from December 2019 by Nahverkehrsgesellschaft Baden-Württemberg and the Bavarian rail authority Bayerische Eisenbahngesellschaft (BEG).

Services

Rolling stock

To commence operations, Go-Ahead purchased 45 Stadler Flirts.

References

External links
 Go-Ahead Baden-Württemberg

Go-Ahead Group companies
Railway companies of Germany
Railway companies established in 2019
Companies based in Berlin
German companies established in 2019